Son Ji-yoon (born Son Su-jeong, February 18, 1983) is a South Korean actress. Debuting in the play Sea Fog in 2007, Son's portfolio of works were majority theater plays and few musicals. Since 2017, Son started acting for minor roles in films and television dramas.

Son popularity as actress in Daehangno proven by two nomination and one award as best supporting actress from StageTalk Audience's Choice Awards (SACA). She were nominated for SACA best supporting actress in 2016 for her roles in Gloria and Toc Toc. Son nominated again in 2018 SACA for best supporting actress in play The Helmet. She finally won 2019 SACA best supporting actress for role Sylvia in play The Pride.

Career

Early years and debut 

Son Ji-yoon was born Son Su-jeong on February 18, 1983, in Seoul. She attended all-girl High School. At high school, She was known as a talkactive girl, so her friend suggest her to enroll to the theater and film department to further show her talent. She followed the advice and prepared for about three months. She passed the test. While attending university, Son watch her first play Our Town. Son felt that was too cool to be on stage wearing old clothes and playing someone else. Since then She seriously wanted to be an actress. In college Son wasn't a diligent student as she often missed her class. However Son never missed any theater workshop class. She even kept on working on performances during vacations, almost living in schools and theaters. She naturally thought that she should become a theater actress, and after graduating for about a year, she was lucky enough to join Yeonwoo Theater Company. After about half a year, Son debuted as theater actress with play Haemoo (Sea Fog) in 2007.

In 2008, Son was cast as Louise Hamilton in play Loving You, Korean adaptation of play Why Not Stay for Breakfast by playwright Ray Cooney and Gene Stone. Produced by Papa Productions, Korean premiere was held at the Happy Theater in Daehangno from July 11 to August 31. Son worked with director Lee Hyun-gyu for her first lead role and acted opposite senior actor Hong Sung-duk.

In 2009, Son joined casts of Gil Sambongdeum as Maeng-hwa. It is a work by writer Kim Min-jung and director Ahn Kyung-mo, who worked together in the play Haemu (2007). The Play was produced by Yeonwoo Theater Company and Namsan Arts Center as part of Namsan Arts Center 2009 Season Program Contents.

In the end of 2009, Son co-starred opposite Min Jun-ho in romantic comedy play A Dramatic Night. She played female character name Si-hoo opposite Min Jun-ho who played Jeong-hoon. Both actors had to delicately expresses subtle psychological changes between men and women through one-night stand. This performance, presented by Yeonwoo Theater Company, was written by Hwang Yun-jeong, a young writer in her 20, a selected work of the 2009 New Year's Literary Arts Festival and received favorable reviews for her delightful story of love. This play was directed by Lee Jae-jun, who stood out at the 2007 Miryang Summer Performing Arts Festival Young Director's Home Awards and won the Best Director and Best Picture at the same time. A Dramatic Night was premiered at Yeonwoo Theater in Daehangno from December 16, 2009, to January 17, 2010.

In 2010 Son auditioned for play Rooftop House Cat, adaptation from web novel that already adapted into MBC hit drama series with the same title. She was triple casts as female lead Nam Jeong-eun with actress Hwang Bo-ra and Kim Yeo-jin, in first season of the performance which was directed by Kim Tae-hyung. Actor Sung Tae-joon played opposite her as Lee Kyung-Min.

In the same year, Son reunited again with Sung Tae-joon in encore performance of play A Dramatic Night (2010). Sung was double cast with Min Jun-ho from the premiere performance as Jeong-hoon. Son who reprise her role, Si-hoo, shared the role with actress Yoon Jeong-sun.

In 2011, Son worked again with Min Jun-ho in a play where he was a director, one Best Play Repertoire, If With You (2011) by Japanese playwright Koki Mitani. She played supporting role Koiso Fujimi, the youngest sister of Koiso family. The play If With You is a comedy play about the love between a 70-year-old gentleman and a 28-year-old lady. The unpredictable and absurd episode unfolds through the lies that bite the tails of the characters in the play. This performance is the Gangnam encore performance following the Daehangno performance.

Work as musical actress 
In 2012, Son debuted as musical actress as supporting actress in musical Rude Miss Young-ae. It is a creative musical released by CJ E&M after two years of preparation, from tvN longest season drama Rude Miss Young-ae. It is also the last work of playwright late Ahn Hyeon-jeong. She reprise her role in two come back performance in 2013.

In 2014, Son and actress Cha Su-yeon shared the role of Hyo-jin for musical Two Weddings and a Funeral. The original movie Two Weddings and a Funeral won the Atreon Award for Feature Film at the 12th Seoul International Women's Film Festival. It was reborn as a musical drama with playwright Cho Min-ju and director Kim Tae-hyung. Jung Dong-hwa and Park Seong-hoon were cast for the role of Min-soo, a homosexual general hospital doctor. Hyo-jin, a lesbian agreed to marry Min-soo on paper so she can adopt a child.

Theater Ganda 
Son met Min Jun-ho, as fellow actor in Yeonwoo Stage. They acted together as costar in play Dramatic Night (2009) and Dramatic Night (2010). Beside being an actor Min Jun-ho is a playwright and theater director who established his own theater company, Theater Ganda. Few years later Son joined few projects by Theater Ganda. In 2013, Son joined debut performance of play Me and Grandpa, written by Min Jun-ho. The play successfully completed a reading performance at the Namsan Drama Festival on February 21, 2013, and received favorable reviews from the audience and critics. Son shared the role of Jun-hee's grandmother with actress Jeong Seon-ah who participated in the last reading performance with Jin Seon-gyu(grandfather), Oh Eui-sik (Jun-hee), and Lee Seok (writer). New casts for debut performance were Oh Yong-lee (grandfather), Hong Woo-jin (Jun-hee), and Yang Kyung-won (writer). It was performed from July 11 to August 4 at Daehangno Information Center.

In the end of the same year, Son was invited as one of representative actress of Daehak-ro, in project 'Ganda GO', the 10th anniversary parade of the theater company 'Ganda Performance Delivery Service'. First work was play Almost Maine by John Cariani. Following the play Almost Maine, the play Me and Grandpa was selected as the second work of 'Ganda GO'. It was performed from February 7, 2014, at Art One Theater 3, Daehak-ro, Dongsung-dong, Jongno-gu, Seoul. Son, who was loved by many audiences in the debut performance by digesting the lines naturally, was become a vital force in the play by going back and forth between the grandmother and multi roles.

Working with Kim Tae-hyung/No Name 
In 2013, Son worked again with Director Kim Tae-hyun in play The Age of Love (2013), which was adapted from Hisashi Nozawa's best-selling Japanese novel. She shared the leading female role, Haru, a sports center instructor with actress Hwang In-young and Shim Eun-jin.

In 2014, Son worked for the first time with Noname Theater Company for the Korean premiere of Fight of Cocks written by a young British playwright Mike Bartlett. The play depicts the heavy subject of 'subjectivity and choice' through John, who has to choose between a man and a woman due to the confusion of gender identity. At the UK premiere in 2009, it drew attention for the casting of actors such as Ben Whishaw. It won the Lawrence Olivier Award in 2010, and performed in New York off-Broadway in 2012. Actors Park Eun-seok was cast as John and Son Ji-yoon of appeared as W, John's new lover of the opposite sex. Other two casts were Kim Jun-won, and Seon Jong-nam. It performed at Doosan Art Center Space 111, Seoul from July 11 to August 3, 2014, and received a warm response.

She worked again in 6th work of NoName Theater Company in Korean premiere of play Metamorphoses (2015), work reconstructed by the famous American play, Mary Zimmerman, of the epic poem Metamorphoses, written by the ancient Roman poet Ovid on Greek and Roman mythology. The work won major awards such as the 2002 Tony Awards and the Drama Desk Awards. Directed by Byun Jeong-Ju, Korean adaptation was premiered at the Little Theater of the Seoul Arts Center.

In 2016, Son reunited with Director Kim Tae-hyung again in Korean premiere of the play Gloria, the work of the playwright Brandon Jacobs-Jenkins, which was nominated for the 2016 Pulitzer Prize. It was co-produced by Noname Theater Company and Dosan Art Center. Son acted as female lead Kendra opposite of actor Won Won-jo as Rorin. Other cast were Oh Jung-taek (Miles), and Gong Ji-ji (Annie). Through her role as Gloria, Son was nominated as best theater actress in 2016 SACA award.

In 2017, Son was returned as W in the encore performance Fight of Cocks with fellow actor from the premiere who play F, Seon Jong-nam. Lee Myung-haeng and Lee Tae-goo join as new casts. In the same year, Son also back in Gloriareenactment 2017, was performed at Art One Theater 3 from July 14 to August 13.

In 2018, Son joined 4th encore performance of Capone Trilogy in Hongik University Daehak-ro Art Center. She share the role lady with actress Kim Ji-hyun, and Choi Yu-ha. Other casts were Lee Seok-jun, Kim Jong-tae, and Kim Joo-hyun, triple casts as Oldman. Young-man role were shared by Kim Do-bin, Kang Jung-woo, Yoon Na-mu. Capone Trilogy play is based on the original work of Jamie Wilkes, a writer who has emerged as a favorite of British literature through Bunker Trilogy and Frontier Trilogy.

Recent theater works 
In 2021, Son and Woo Jung-won were double-casts for the role of C, in the play The Dressing Room (Gakuya). C, who is playing the role of Nina, is a character who constantly memorizes lines in the dressing room and maintains a state of tension. The play is the representative work of Kunio Shimizu, a famous Japanese playwright who passed away in April of this year.

In May 2022, it was announced that Son will joined the third work of The 9th Best Plays Festival, play Touching the Void by David Greig. It is based on the true story of the survival of two British mountain climbers, Joe Simpson and Simon Yates. Son is double casts with actress Lee Jin-hee for role Sara, Joe Simpson's sister. Korean premiere is directed by Kim Dong-yeon, who is currently the most notable director in the Korean performance industry and will be performed at Art One Theater 2 in Daehangno from July 8 to September 9, 2022.

Personal life 
On November 24, 2013, She married actor . Their relationship began in 2010 after she met her future husband in the plays Rooftop House Cat (2010) and Dramatic Night (2010), where they both played as lovers.

Filmography

Film

Television

Stage

Musical

Theater

Awards and nominations

Notes

References

External links 
 
 
  
 Son Ji-Yoon at Daum Encyclopedia 
 Son Ji-Yoon at Daum Movie 
 Son Ji-Yoon at PlayDB  

Living people
1983 births
South Korean film actresses
South Korean musical theatre actresses
South Korean stage actresses
South Korean television actresses
21st-century South Korean actresses